The forest gecko (Mokopirirakau granulatus) is a species of gecko.  Granulatus refers to the granular texture of the skin. Its Māori name is moko pirirākau ("lizard that clings to trees"). It is endemic to New Zealand, found in all areas except the Far North, Marlborough, and Canterbury.

In June 2010 seven forest geckos, four female and three male, were stolen from a wildlife park in Northland. Forest geckos are a protected species under the Wildlife Act 1953.

Conservation status 
In 2012 the Department of Conservation reclassified the forest gecko as At Risk under the New Zealand Threat Classification System. It was judged as meeting the criteria for At Risk threat status as a result of it having a low to high ongoing or predicted decline. This gecko is also regarded as being Data Poor which indicates the Department of Conservations uncertainty about the listing due to lack of data.

See also
Geckos of New Zealand

References

External links

 Hoplodactylus granulatus at the New Zealand Herpetological Society
 Hoplodactylus granulatus at the J. Craig Venter Institute

Mokopirirakau
Endemic fauna of New Zealand
Reptiles of New Zealand
Reptiles described in 1845
Taxa named by John Edward Gray
Endemic reptiles of New Zealand